The Valdostan regional election of 1998 took place on 31 May 1998.

Results

Sources: Regional Council of Aosta Valley and Istituto Cattaneo

Elections in Aosta Valley
1998 elections in Italy
May 1998 events in Europe